Naphrys is a genus of North American jumping spiders that was first described by Glavis Bernard Edwards in 2003. The name is a portmanteau of "North America" and "Euophrys".

Species
 it contains four species, found only in Canada, Mexico, and the United States:
Naphrys acerba (Peckham & Peckham, 1909) (type) – USA, Mexico
Naphrys bufoides (Chamberlin & Ivie, 1944) – USA
Naphrys pulex (Hentz, 1846) – USA, Canada
Naphrys xerophila (Richman, 1981) – USA

References

Salticidae genera
Salticidae
Spiders of North America